Wynne is the county seat and largest city of Cross County, Arkansas, United States. The population was 8,367 at the 2010 Census. Nestled between the Arkansas Delta and Crowley's Ridge, Wynne is the closest city to the second-largest state park in Arkansas, Village Creek State Park.

Early history

Wynne was named for Captain Jesse Watkins Wynne, a Texan who achieved the rank of captain in the Civil War at the age of just 21. He was famed for leading a group of his captors up to the Confederate lines, where he then marched them to headquarters as his own prisoners.

In 1867, Captain Wynne moved to St. Francis County, Arkansas, and joined the finance company of Dennis & Beck. At that time, the Dennis & Beck company held savings for other companies and for individuals, but eventually, it became the Bank of Eastern Arkansas, and Wynne became its first president.

From 1880 to 1885, as the St. Louis, Iron Mountain, and Southern Railroad was under construction, active steamboat riverports like Wittsburg, at that time the county seat of Cross County, were deserted for the railroads.

The location of the settlement of Wynne was first chosen in 1882, when a train derailed, leaving one boxcar without wheels and off the tracks. That boxcar was then turned upright as a building, and as a compliment to Captain Wynne, it was designated the "Wynne Station". On September 27, 1882, the Wynne Station Post Office was opened.

When the east–west railroad line was completed, it crossed the north–south line near the boxcar, and the name "Wynne Junction" became well known in the area. On May 28, 1888, the "Junction" part of the name was dropped, and the town of Wynne was formed.

By the 1890s, the railroad traffic and the resulting activity in Wynne made it a more vibrant town than the town of Vanndale, which had been the county seat since 1886. In 1903, the county seat of Cross County was moved to Wynne.

With the advent of the U.S. Highway System in the 1920s and 30s, U.S. Route 64 was built west from Memphis, through Wynne, and to points west. Also, the north–south Arkansas Highway 1 was built through Wynne, making it an important highway crossroads for several decades, in addition to being a railroad town. Since the advent of the Interstate Highway System, Interstate 40 has largely diverted long-distance travel away from Wynne.

Geography
Wynne lies in south-central Cross County at  (35.227435, -90.789435), the boundary between two distinct geographical areas of Arkansas: the fertile farmland of the Arkansas Delta (which is a part of the larger Mississippi Alluvial Plain), and Crowley's Ridge, a distinct rise marking the New Madrid Fault Line.

U.S. Route 64 passes through the northern side of the city, leading east  to Marion and west  to Searcy. Arkansas Highway 1 leads north  to Harrisburg and south  to Interstate 40 at Forrest City.

The town of Wynne is considered "the city with a smile" and displays this title proudly on their single overpass which is also painted in the school colors of blue and gold. However, the city is still largely segregated and has several railroad tracks that divide its residents that many have believed is due to race. Because of the lack of city funding and planning much of the West part of town has had little to no upkeep by the city. Consisting hugely of African-American residents, the West side of Wynne was once considered a staple of black business from the post Civil Rights era to well into the mid 1990s. Community staples such as Bud Davis’ Bar & Grill, Miss Anna's, Hollywood Night-Club, Club D’Essence, Woodard Funeral Home, Johnson's Funeral Home, Waits BBQ, and Smith's Grocery were all beneficial in providing a steady cash flow as well as entertainment for the African-American residents of Wynne. Youth programs thrived such as Boyz II Men/Girls 2 Women and the various black churches like Union Valley Missionary Baptist Church, First Baptist Church, St. James Church and Jones Temple COGIC all provided various scholarships for its graduating members. Around the early to mid 2000s, Wynne saw many members of the African-American community die or move to more economically developed parts of Arkansas and/or the country. This led to a drastic decline in revenue for the African-American community of Wynne that has yet to recover from.

Demographics

2020 census

As of the 2020 United States Census, there were 8,314 people, 3,104 households, and 2,052 families residing in the city.

2000 census
According to the census of 2000, there were 8,615 people, 3,245 households, and 2,323 families residing in the city. The racial makeup of the city was 75.91% White, 22.32% Black or African American, 0.15% Native American, 0.48% Asian, 0.27% from other races, and 0.88% from two or more races.  1.03% of the population were Hispanic or Latino of any race.

There were 3,245 households, out of which 36.1% had children under the age of 18 living with them, 48.5% were married couples living together, 19.0% had a female householder with no husband present, and 28.4% were non-families. 26.2% of all households were made up of individuals, and 12.6% had someone living alone who was 65 years of age or older.  The average household size was 2.56 and the average family size was 3.09.

The age distribution of the population shows 28.7% under the age of 18, 8.7% from 18 to 24, 27.4% from 25 to 44, 20.4% from 45 to 64, and 14.8% who were 65 years of age or older.  The median age was 35 years. For every 100 females, there were 87.9 males.  For every 100 woman age 18 and over, there were 80.4 men.

The median income for a household in the city was $30,125, and the median income for a family was $35,714.  Males had a median income of $30,506 versus $20,567 for females. The per capita income for the city was $15,800.  About 17.9% of families and 21.4% of the population were below the poverty line, including 30.7% of those under age 18 and 17.6% of those age 65 or over.

Education

Wynne has a public school system that consists of four different schools. The first school is Wynne Primary School which is for children in grades Kindergarten through second grade. The second school is Wynne Intermediate School which is for children in grades 3–5. The third school is Wynne Junior High School which is for grades 6–8. The fourth school, Wynne High School is for grades 9–12.

Wynne also has a branch of the East Arkansas Community College located on Falls Boulevard.

The New Hope School was one of the original buildings constructed to serve students of District 25. It was donated in 2007 to the Cross County Historical Society where it was restored to its original appearance. In 2008, it was added to the U.S. National Register of Historic Places.

Notable people
Cortney Lance Bledsoe, poet, writer, and book reviewer, born in Wynne in 1976
Jessica Andrews, country music singer 
Ronald R. Caldwell, Republican Arkansas state senator from District 23; a Wynne real estate businessman 
Clay Ford (1938–2013), Republican former member of the Florida House of Representatives from 2007 until his death; member of the Arkansas House of Representatives from 1975 to 1976; born in Wynne
Carlos Norman Hathcock II, (May 20, 1942 – February 22, 1999) a United States Marine Corps sniper with a service record of 93 confirmed kills, and the real life basis for the 1993 Tom Berenger film, Sniper.
Rick Husky, television producer
James Luker, Arkansas state legislator and mayor of Wynne
James Levesque "Bex" Shaver, Sr., ninth Lieutenant Governor of Arkansas.
William L. Spicer, chairman of the Arkansas Republican Party from 1962 to 1964, lived in Wynne during his early years 
Hugh "Bones" Taylor, who played wide receiver with the Washington Redskins from 1947 to 1954, and was honored as one of the 70 Greatest Redskins  in 2002. Taylor was later the head coach of the Houston Oilers in 1965, and was an assistant with the New York Titans, Pittsburgh Steelers, and the San Diego Chargers.
DeAngelo Williams, a former Wynne Yellowjacket, is a retired running back who played in the NFL from 2006 to 2016.

Notable places
Cross County Courthouse
Cross County Library
Cross County Museum
Historic Downtown Wynne
Jesse Wynne Park
Village Creek State Park

Media

Newspapers

The Wynne Progress is the main newspaper in the city of Wynne. The Wynne, Arkansas Progress is in the Memphis, Tennessee DMA. It serves both Wynne and Cross County. It has been in publication for over 100 years. The Wynne Progress is published weekly.

Radio stations

KWYN is the main broadcasting station in the city of Wynne. They operate 92.5 FM which is primarily country music and 1400 AM which is primarily news and sports. These stations are part of the East Arkansas Broadcasters, Incorporated.

Gallery

Climate
The climate in this area is characterized by hot, humid summers and generally mild to cool winters.  According to the Köppen climate classification system, Wynne has a humid subtropical climate, abbreviated "Cfa" on climate maps.

References

External links

City of Wynne official website
"History of Wynne's Jewish community" ,  Institute of Southern Jewish Life
Cross County Historical Society
"Wynne (Cross County)", Encyclopedia of Arkansas History & Culture
  New Hope School Museum

Cities in Cross County, Arkansas
Cities in Arkansas
County seats in Arkansas